Delizia di Belriguardo is the headquarters of the Museo civico di Belriguardo. It was built by Niccolò III d'Este. Lucrezia Borgia stayed here frequently.

At the end of the 1400s, Sabadino degli Arienti wrote a description of the palazzo. In 1493, Ludovico il Moro wrote a letter to Beatrice d'Este saying:

References

External links
 

Palaces in Ferrara
Este residences
World Heritage Sites in Italy
Villas in Emilia-Romagna